The MTV Europe Music Award for Best Latin has been awarded since 2020. During the 2010s, the award show implemented the first Latin categories since the ceremony of 2013, including regional categories and the Best Latin American Act (continental category) being the predecessor of Best Latin. 

It's one of the current Latin categories of the ceremony along with Best Caribbean, Latin America North, South and Central Act. Best Latin category is also the only one that rewards artist(s) of Latin music as a musical genre, and not as a nationality.

Winners and nominees 
Winners are listed first and highlighted in bold. 
† indicates an MTV Video Music Award for Best Latin–winning artist.

2020s

See also 
 MTV Video Music Award for Best Latin
 MTV Europe Music Award for Best Caribbean Act
 MTV Europe Music Award for Best Latin America North Act
 MTV Europe Music Award for Best Latin America South Act
 MTV Europe Music Award for Best Latin America Central Act

References 

MTV Europe Music Awards
Latin music
Awards established in 2020